Nazareth Bank is a large submerged bank in the Indian Ocean.

Geography
It lies about 1,040 km east of northern Madagascar and 280 km south of the Saya de Malha Bank. The closest land is Cargados Carajos shoals, a small and remote dependency of Mauritius located 140 km to the southwest. The Nazareth Bank is part of the vast undersea Mascarene Plateau and of the Reunion hotspot track.

Its extent is about 176 km north–south and up to 87 km east–west, with a surface of about 11,000 km2. This undersea bank is administered by Mauritius.

See also
Hawkins Bank
Saya de Malha Bank
Soudan Banks

References

External links
 Mauritius District and Dependencies - Nazareth Bank

Landforms of Mauritius
Fishing areas of the Indian Ocean
Outer Islands of Mauritius
Landforms of Africa
Undersea banks of the Indian Ocean